Pol-e Piran (also Romanized as Pol-e Pīrān and Pol Pīrān; also known as Pol Biran, Pol-e Parān, and Pulpirān) is a village in Sarduiyeh Rural District, Sarduiyeh District, Jiroft County, Kerman Province, Iran. At the 2006 census, its population was 351, in 61 families.

References 

Populated places in Jiroft County